The city of Glasgow, located in Scotland, UK, is represented in both the Westminster Parliament in London, and the Scottish Parliament in Holyrood, Edinburgh. At Westminster, it is represented by seven Members of Parliament (MPs), all elected to represent individual constituencies at least once every five years, using the first-past-the-post system of voting. In Holyrood, Glasgow is represented by sixteen MSPs, nine of whom are elected to represent individual constituencies once every five years using first-past-the-post, and seven of whom are elected as additional members, through proportional representation.

The current Westminster constituencies have been in use since the 2005 General Election, and those currently used at Holyrood were implemented following a boundary review in 2011. At Westminster, six MPs representing Glasgow constituencies belong to the Scottish National Party and one from the Labour Party. Each MP was elected in 2017. In Holyrood, following elections in May 2016, all nine Glasgow constituency seats are currently held by the Scottish National Party. Four Labour members, as well as two from the Conservative party and one from the Green Party, were also elected from the Glasgow regional list.

Westminster constituencies

Table as after the 2019 United Kingdom general election:

Holyrood constituencies

Current (since 2011)
Glasgow Anniesland
Glasgow Cathcart
Glasgow Kelvin
Glasgow Maryhill and Springburn
Glasgow Pollok
Glasgow Provan
Glasgow Shettleston
Glasgow Southside
Historic (1999 to 2007)
Glasgow Baillieston
Glasgow Govan
Glasgow Maryhill
Glasgow Springburn
Glasgow Rutherglen·
Elections
1999
2003
2007
2011
2016
2021

Historical representation

1708–1801
 Clyde Burghs – Burgh constituency which elected one MP to Westminster.

1832–1885
 Glasgow – Burgh constituency which elected two MPs to Westminster from 1832 to 1868, and then three members from 1868 to 1885.

1885–1918
Glasgow Blackfriars and Hutchesontown
Glasgow Bridgeton
Glasgow Camlachie
Glasgow College
Glasgow Central
Glasgow St Rollox
Glasgow Tradeston

1918–1950

Glasgow Bridgeton
Glasgow Camlachie
Glasgow Cathcart
Glasgow Central
Glasgow Gorbals
Glasgow Govan
Glasgow Hillhead
Glasgow Kelvingrove
Glasgow Maryhill
Glasgow Partick
Glasgow Pollok
Glasgow St. Rollox
Glasgow Shettleston
Glasgow Springburn
Glasgow Tradeston

1950–1955
Glasgow Bridgeton
Glasgow Camlachie
Glasgow Cathcart
Glasgow Central
Glasgow Gorbals
Glasgow Govan
Glasgow Hillhead
Glasgow Kelvingrove
Glasgow Maryhill
Glasgow Pollok
Glasgow Scotstoun
Glasgow Shettleston
Glasgow Springburn
Glasgow Tradeston
Glasgow Woodside

1955–1974
Glasgow Bridgeton
Glasgow Cathcart
Glasgow Central
Glasgow Gorbals
Glasgow Govan
Glasgow Hillhead
Glasgow Kelvingrove
Glasgow Maryhill
Glasgow Pollok
Glasgow Provan
Glasgow Scotstoun
Glasgow Shettleston
Glasgow Springburn
Glasgow Tradeston
Glasgow Woodside

1974–1983

Glasgow Cathcart
Glasgow Central
Glasgow Craigton
Glasgow Garscadden
Glasgow Govan
Glasgow Hillhead
Glasgow Kelvingrove
Glasgow Maryhill
Glasgow Pollok
Glasgow Provan
Glasgow Queen's Park
Glasgow Shettleston
Glasgow Springburn

1983–1997 (11 MPs)

1997–2005 (10 MPs)

These constituencies were also used in the Scottish Parliament (1999–2011).

2005 – present (7 MPs)

See also
Glasgow City Council
Glasgow (European Parliament constituency)
Politics of Glasgow
Wards of Glasgow

References

Politics of Glasgow
Scotland politics-related lists
Lists of constituencies of the Parliament of the United Kingdom in Scotland